Santarcangelo may refer to:

Sant'Arcangelo, a town and comune in the province of Potenza (Basilicata), Italy
Santarcangelo di Romagna, a town and comune in the province of Rimini (Emilia-Romagna), Italy
Santarcangelo Calcio, an Italian association football club, based in Santarcangelo di Romagna.
Sant'Arcangelo Trimonte, a comune in the Province of Benevento (Campania), Italy